José Luis Mumbiela Sierra (born 27 May 1969 in Monzón, Spain) is a Spanish-born Roman Catholic prelate and Bishop of the Holy Trinity Diocese in Almaty.

He was ordained on 25 June 1995 and was incardinated in the diocese of Lleida. In 1998 began missionary work in Kazakhstan. He was rector of the seminary in Karaganda. On 5 March 2011 Pope Benedict XVI appointed him bishop of the Holy Trinity in Almaty. He replaced the retiring Bishop Henry Howańca, OFM. On 8 May 2011 Sierra was ordained bishop by Apostolic Nuncio to Kazakhstan, Archbishop Miguel Maury Buendía.

Call for Peace 
In January 2022, following weeks of civil unrest, Mumbiela addressed the issue in a message sent to international Catholic charity Aid to the Church in Need. In his message, spoken in Russian, he stated that "people in Kazakhstan, especially in Almaty didn’t deserve anything like this", and asked all those involved to work for peace. "We have to remember that peace is in our hands and depends on us. Blessed are the peacemakers. Let us not only pray for peace, but also create peace for others with the help of God”, he asks, adding “let us try to rebuild the Kazakhstan that we all dream of together, with all the people of this country and of this city, an international and interreligious Kazakhstan, a Kazakhstan of peace and harmony, a Kazakhstan that God loves and blesses with the special love of Holy Mary, Queen of Peace of this nation". He also thanked those who had provided the people with safety during the unrest.

Papal visit 
Days before Pope Francis visited Kazakhstan to participante in the 7th Congress of Leaders of World and Traditional Religions, bishop Mumbiela said in a press conference organised by Aid to the Church in Need that "Following the sad incidents of violence that Kazakhstan suffered at the beginning of this year, the Pope is coming to tell us that we are not alone, that we need to keep moving forward. The Pope told the president that he greatly values all that Kazakhstan has done to work for peace and harmony, and that he is coming as a show of support. Pope Francis’ visit is more than just a show of support for the government, it extends to the whole country. This year we are celebrating thirty years of independence and of our Constitution. This is support for a quest for the identity of this country, according to certain values, including religious harmony."

References

External links

http://www.catholic-hierarchy.org/bishop/bmumsie.html 
http://www.gcatholic.org/dioceses/diocese/ztri1.htm

1969 births
Living people
Kazakhstani Roman Catholic bishops
Spanish Roman Catholic bishops
People from Cinca Medio
Bishops appointed by Pope Benedict XVI